Central Point may refer to:

 Central Point, Oregon, a city
 Central Point, Virginia, an unincorporated community
 Central Point Software, a former software utilities maker acquired by Symantec

See also 
 Cottages at Central Point, on Keuka Lake in Steuben County, New York
 Graph center
 Centerpoint (disambiguation)